Brand New-U (also known as Identicals in the United States) is a 2015 science fiction, thriller film written and directed by Simon Pummell and produced by Janine Marmot. It stars Lachlan Nieboer and Nora-Jane Noone.

Cast 
Lachlan Nieboer as Slater
Nora-Jane Noone as Nadia
Nick Blood as Johan
Tony Way as Gun Dealer / Santa
Robert Wilfort as Surgeon Two 'Peter'
Jacinta Mulcahy as Abigail
Tim Ahern as The Founder
Anthony Cozens as Friend One
Andrew Buckley as Friend Two
Tim Faraday as Finder (voice)
Sukie Smith as Waitress 'Sarah'
Clare Monnelly as Worker
Phelim Kelly as Shopper
Martin Richardson as Santa 2 / Slater's Body Double
Michelle Asante as Manager
David Michael Scott as Brand New-U Raider Driver 
Jamael Westman as Brand New-U Hood Kemal

Production

Pre-production 
Brand New-U is bankrolled by the BFI Film Fund, Irish Film Board, Netherlands Film Fund and Finite Films. The film made the official selection for the Rotterdam Lab and is a multi platform, transmedia project featuring urban projection, geo- specific augmented reality, and online media.

Casting 
In March 2013, Lachlan Nieboer and Nora-Jane Noone were cast as the two leads playing Slater and Nadia respectively.

Filming 
Principal photography started on 1 April 2013 for four weeks in London, England and Dublin, Ireland.

Marketing 
Two pictures were released on 10 May 2013 via Total Film.

References

External links 
Official site

2015 action thriller films
English films
English-language Irish films
English-language Dutch films
Films shot in England
Films shot in London
Irish science fiction films
Dutch science fiction films
Films shot in the Republic of Ireland
2015 films
2010s English-language films
British science fiction films
2010s British films